The 1999 Salem Open was a men's tennis tournament played on Hard courts in Hong Kong that was part of the International Series of the 1999 ATP Tour. It was the twenty-fourth edition of the tournament and was held from 5 April – 12 April.

Finals

Singles

 Andre Agassi defeated  Boris Becker, 6–7(4–7), 6–4, 6–4.
 It was Agassi's 1st singles title of the year and the 40th of his career.

Doubles

 James Greenhalgh /  Grant Silcock defeated  Andre Agassi /  David Wheaton, walkover.

References

External links
 ITF tournament edition detials

Salem Open
1999
1999 in Hong Kong sport
1999 in Chinese tennis